Markian Mikhaylovich Popov (1902–1969) was a Soviet military commander, Army General (26 August 1943), and Hero of the Soviet Union (1965).

Early life
Markian Popov was born in 1902 in Ust-Medvediskaya in the Don Host Oblast (now Volgograd Oblast) in a family of Russian ethnicity. His father was a civil servant. Popov joined the Red Army in 1920 and the Bolshevik Party in 1921.

World War II 
During the German–Soviet War at various times he commanded a number of Armies and a number of Fronts. His career was uneven. In June 1941 he was Commander of the Leningrad Military District, then Northern Front (24 June – 5 September). The Germans advanced with a terrific speed, but then they were halted just before Leningrad. The army group was on 26 August renamed as the Leningrad Front. Then he participated in Zhukov's counteroffensive before Moscow. Zhukov, who co-ordinated several fronts in this Moscow sector, tried to collect able commanders in the area. So for example the 16th Army (Western Front) was headed by General Rokossovsky, the 4th Shock Army’s commander was General Yeryomenko, the 5th Army was under General Govorov. On December 18 Popov was appointed Commander of the 61st Army (Bryansk Front) and fought well during the counteroffensive.

He maintained this position until 28 June 1942. Then he was shifted to the Stalingrad area. He was Assistant Commander of the Stalingrad Front (under Yeremenko, 13 October – 20 November), then Commander of the 5th Shock Army (8 December – 28 December). On December 26 this army was switched to Vatutin's Southwestern Front. In 1943 firstly he commanded a larger mechanized group, but in February his unit was badly defeated.

Then he was appointed Commander of the Bryansk Front (5 June – 10 October 1943), with which he participated in the Battle of Kursk. During the battle, the Bryansk Front was very successful in pushing back the German opposition, and was able to capture Oryol and Bryansk in August. He was promoted to Army General (26 August 1943). After the Battle of Kursk he was sent north, to command the 2nd Baltic Front (20 October 1943 – 23 April 1944). He was demoted to Colonel General (20 April 1944) because of the unsuccessful actions in the Baltic area, but the real reason seems to be his criticism on Nikolai Bulganin, who was Commissar at the front. Until the end of the war he was Chief of Staff of the Leningrad Front.

After the War 
After the war, he commanded the Soviet troops in the Lviv Military District until 1946, then the Taurida Military District until 1954. After Stalin's death, he regained his old rank as Army general on 3 August 1953. In 1956–62 he was Chief of the General Staff of the Soviet Ground Forces. On 7 May 1965, he was subsequently honored with the title Hero of the Soviet Union for his services during World War II. 

He died on 22 April 1969 from an accidental fire at home and was buried in Moscow's Novodevichy Cemetery.

He was never given the rank Marshal of the Soviet Union, although Marshal of Aviation Golovanov and Marshal Vasilevsky considered him very talented.

Awards and decorations
Soviet Union

Foreign

References

page from warheroes.ru in Russian

External links
Army Gen. M. M. Popov at Generals.dk

1902 births
1969 deaths
People from Serafimovichsky District
People from Don Host Oblast
Bolsheviks
Communist Party of the Soviet Union members
Second convocation members of the Soviet of the Union
Third convocation members of the Soviet of the Union
Fourth convocation members of the Soviet of the Union
Fifth convocation members of the Soviet of the Union
Sixth convocation members of the Soviet of the Union
Army generals (Soviet Union)
Frunze Military Academy alumni
Soviet military personnel of the Russian Civil War
Soviet military personnel of World War II
Heroes of the Soviet Union
Recipients of the Order of Lenin
Recipients of the Order of the Red Banner
Recipients of the Order of the Red Star
Recipients of the Order of Suvorov, 1st class
Recipients of the Order of Kutuzov, 1st class
Recipients of the Czechoslovak War Cross
Burials at Novodevichy Cemetery
Recipients of the Military Order of the White Lion
Accidental deaths in the Soviet Union